Ursula Nerke-Petersen (born 14 January 1944 in Komotau, Sudetenland, Germany) is a German actress and television presenter. She became well known as host of the monthly music television show Beat-Club that ran from 1965 to 1972 and as host of its successor Musikladen until 1978.

Biography 
Uschi Nerke was born in Komotau, which is now known as Chomutov, Czech Republic. She was raised in Hamburg and Bremen. She studied architecture from 1962–1968 before running an architects office until 1978.

In 1988, she married textile salesman Günther Petersen.

Filmography

References 

Living people
1944 births
German actresses
German television presenters
People from Chomutov
Sudeten German people
Actresses from Hamburg
Mass media people from Bremen
German women television presenters
ARD (broadcaster) people
Radio Bremen people